MY Jairo Mora Sandoval is a vessel in the Sea Shepherd Conservation Society fleet. It was purchased by Sea Shepherd UK and announced on June 26, 2013. The vessel was named after Jairo Mora Sandoval, a sea turtle conservationist murdered in Costa Rica in May 2013.

Operation Sunu Gaal 
In January 2014, it was announced that the Jairo Mora Sandoval was deployed in West Africa to assist the Senegal government in locating illegal fishing operations.

References 

Sea Shepherd Conservation Society ships